Burbage is a village in Derbyshire and was a parish until 1961, when it became part of the parish of Buxton. At the 2011 Census Burbage was a ward of the High Peak Borough Council. The population taken at this Census was 2,540.

Burbage is well known for its brass band, the Burbage Band (Buxton).

Burbage backs onto Grinlow Woods to the south and provides access to Solomon's Temple. Burbage Edge overlooks the settlement from the west.

Burbage Tunnel (now blocked) is a remnant of the Cromford and High Peak Railway, which operated from 1831 to 1967, although the section near Burbage was abandoned in the 1890s in favour of a new alignment via Buxton.

Christchurch at Burbage was designed by Henry Currey (architect for the Duke of Devonshire's estate) and was built in 1861. The Public Hall at Burbage was opened in July 1894 by Lady Cavendish and Lady Goring. It was built opposite Christchurch at the junction of Leek Road and Old Macclesfield Road. The hall held 400 people and was used for all the public events in Burbage for decades. The Burbage war memorial was erected beside it. Later it became Worth’s garage and car showroom. At the eastern end of the building were four shops, occupied amongst others by Thomas’s Grocers, Bonsall’s butchers and Edward’s newsagents. The building was demolished in 2007.

Burbage Golf Club (now defunct) first appeared in 1899. It continued until the 1920s.

The Duke pub (formerly the Duke of York Inn) on St John's Road is a free house. The Red Lion on Holmfield was built in 1842 but it is no longer a pub.

Photographs of Burbage can be found at GENUKI.

See also
Listed buildings in Burbage, Derbyshire

References

External links

Villages in Derbyshire
Towns and villages of the Peak District
High Peak, Derbyshire
Buxton